The 2002–03 season of the Jupiler League began on August 9, 2002 and ended on May 25, 2003.  Club Brugge became champion.

Promoted teams

These teams were promoted from the second division at the start of the season:
K.V. Mechelen (second division champion)
R.A.E.C. Mons (playoff winner)

Relegated teams
These teams were relegated to the second division at the end of the season:
K.V. Mechelen
K.F.C. Lommel S.K. (withdrew before the end of the season)

Final league table

Results

Top goal scorers

See also
2002–03 in Belgian football

References
 Sport.be website - Archive

Belgian Pro League seasons
Belgian
1